The 1992 Hopman Cup was the fourth edition to the Hopman Cup tennis event. Jakob Hlasek and Manuela Maleeva-Fragniere (who mostly, but not in this case, played for Bulgaria) of Switzerland beat Helena Suková and Karel Nováček of Czechoslovakia in the final at the Burswood Entertainment Complex in Perth, Western Australia. The tournament took place between 27 December 1991 through 3 January 1992.

Teams

Seeds
  – Steffi Graf and Boris Becker (semifinalists)
  – Arantxa Sánchez Vicario and Emilio Sánchez (semifinalists)
  – Amy Frazier and Derrick Rostagno (quarterfinalists)
  – Manuela Maleeva-Fragniere and Jakob Hlasek (champions)
  – Helena Suková and Karel Nováček (finalists)
  – Natasha Zvereva and Andrei Cherkasov (quarterfinalists)
  – Julie Halard and Henri Leconte (quarterfinalists)
  – Brenda Schultz and Richard Krajicek (quarterfinalists)

Unseeded
 – Rachel McQuillan and Todd Woodbridge (first round)
 Great Britain – Jo Durie and Jeremy Bates (first round)
 – Kimiko Date and Yasufumi Yamamoto (first round)
 – Catarina Lindqvist and Peter Lundgren – First Round)

Draw

First round

CIS vs. Great Britain

Netherlands vs. Australia

France vs. Sweden

Czechoslovakia vs. Japan

Quarterfinals

Switzerland vs. CIS

Spain vs. Netherlands

Germany vs. France

Czechoslovakia vs. United States

Semifinals

Switzerland vs. Spain

Czechoslovakia vs. Germany

Final

Switzerland vs. Czechoslovakia

External links

1992
Hopman Cup
December 1991 sports events in Australia
January 1992 sports events in Australia